Mark Herbert Ainsworth Davis (25 April 1945 – 18 March 2020) was Professor of Mathematics at Imperial College London. He made fundamental contributions to the theory of stochastic processes, stochastic control and mathematical finance.

Education and career
After completing his BA degree in Electrical Engineering at the University of Cambridge, Davis pursued his PhD degree at UC Berkeley under the supervision of Pravin Varaiya. His PhD thesis, obtained in 1971, initiated the martingale theory of stochastic control. Returning to the UK in 1972, Davis joined the Control Group at Imperial College London. From 1995 to 1999 he was Head of Research and Product Development at Tokyo-Mitsubishi International, leading a quantitative research team providing pricing models and risk analysis for fixed income, equity and credit-related products. He returned to Imperial College London in August 2000 to build Imperial’s Mathematical Finance group within the Department of Mathematics.

Research
Davis   made several contributions to the theory of stochastic processes, stochastic control and mathematical finance.
His doctoral thesis initiated the martingale approach for the study of conditions for the optimal control of stochastic systems given by Ito equations. The approach permitted arbitrary non-anticipative feedback controls and remains the standard way of formulating stochastic control to this day.
One of his key contributions is the martingale optimality principle in stochastic control, which characterizes optimal strategies through the martingale property of the value process. In a 1984 paper he introduced the concept of Piecewise deterministic Markov process, a class of Markov models which have been used in many applications in engineering and science.

In the early 1990s, Davis introduced the deterministic approach to stochastic control by means of appropriate Lagrange multipliers. He was awarded the Naylor Prize by the London Mathematical Society in 2002 for his "contributions to stochastic analysis, stochastic control theory and mathematical finance" and delivered a lecture titled Optimal investment with randomly terminating income.

Davis was one of the founding editors of the journal Mathematical Finance. He  authored   three books on stochastic analysis and optimization.

Bibliography

References

1945 births
2020 deaths
English mathematicians
Fellows of the Royal Statistical Society